The National Council of Iran (NCI), officially the
National Council of Iran for Free Elections, is a loosely based umbrella group of the exiled opposition to Iran's Islamic Republic government,participating in the Iranian democracy movement. 

According to The Observer, it serves as Reza Pahlavi's government in exile in order to reclaim the former throne after overthrowing the current government. It has also been described as an organization that profiles him as "the new president of Iran". 

The "self-styled" National Council claims to have gathered "tens of thousands of pro-democracy proponents from both inside and outside Iran." It also claims to represent religious and ethnic minorities. According to Kenneth Katzman, the group which was established with over 30 groups has "suffered defections and its activity level appears minimal".

References

Political organizations based in France
Political organizations based in the United States
Political organizations based in Canada
Governments in exile
Political party alliances in Iran
2013 establishments in France
Banned political parties in Iran
Monarchist organizations
Monarchist parties in Iran
Secularism in Iran
Iran–United States relations